Slapton Ley is a lake on the south coast of Devon, England, separated from Start Bay by a shingle beach, known as Slapton Sands.

The ley is fed by streams and a small river, The Gara, that flows into the Higher Ley. The site is a National Nature Reserve, a Site of Special Scientific Interest and a Geological Conservation Review site.

The A379 between the Ley and the sea runs along the shingle ridge and was rebuilt after damage by coastal erosion in the early 2000s.

Ecology and wildlife
The Slapton Ley nature reserve is owned by the Whitley Wildlife Conservation Trust and managed by the Field Studies Council. Slapton Ley’s beaches are affected by erosion but the beaches are formed from sediment; this makes them special because they are non-replaceable: once the sediment is moved it is gone. The beach can only become smaller. This threatens the security of the mainland because when the beaches are gone, mass amounts of water damage would occur on the land. The nature reserve would be destroyed and the site of special scientific interest would be lost.

There is a field centre near to the Ley also run by Field Studies Council

There is a large population of Cetti's warbler (Cettia cetti) at the site, and Eurasian bittern (Botaurus stellaris) are resident. Slapton Ley is the only UK site for strapwort (Corrigiola litoralis), a plant identified by Natural England as being at high risk of going extinct by 2020. Seed taken from the site, and grown at Paignton Zoo were successfully replanted at Loe Pool, Cornwall in May 2015; where it had previously been recorded since 1915.

References

Sites of Special Scientific Interest in Devon
Nature Conservation Review sites
National nature reserves in England
Nature reserves in Devon
Lakes of Devon
Stokenham